Bitstream Font Fusion is a small, fast, object-oriented font engine written in ANSI C capable of rendering high-quality text on any platform, any device, and at any resolution. The entire source code is portable, optimized, and executes independent of operating system and processor. The font engine is capable of rendering 2,400-3,300 characters per second on a 100 MIPS CPU.

Font Fusion is designed such that it can meet the memory and performance requirements, even if the Asian languages that contain thousands of characters are to be supported. Font Fusion is also the core technology behind other Bitstream products, Panorama, ThunderHawk and myMMS.

Version history

In late 1980s, Sampo Kaasila, lead developer of TrueType and founder of Type Solutions (now a wholly owned subsidiary of Bitstream Inc.) designed T2K, a font renderer, which provided an object-oriented design, advanced architecture and algorithms, and was capable, to embed in all sorts of devices. Later in 1998, Bitstream acquired Type solutions and T2K evolved into Bitstream's font rasterizer, called Font Fusion.

Features
 Enhanced Font Support - Font Fusion provides support for Web Open Font Format (WOFF), OpenType fonts, Multiple Master Postscript Fonts, and Type1 fonts.
 New Font Manager - The new Font Manager module has been written from the scratch. As compared to previous version, it is faster, consumes less memory, and has a rich set of user APIs. It also includes an optional Android wrapper Add-on which enables an Android application to use Font Fusion rendering engine.
 Optimized hmtx Structure - Includes an optimized Horizontal Metrics hmtx table loading process.
 Added support for 32-bit Filter Tag - Font Fusion includes support for 32 bit Filter Tag, now more number of filters can be added by a user of Font Fusion.
 Lossless Font Compression — The font engine can read and render industry-standard fonts, bitmap fonts, and outline fonts in a compressed format. The engine has a unique capability of font compression such that each font consumes less memory, and achieving a 2-to-1 compression factor. For example, a unified stroke-based CJK font, with 37,000 characters is under 1MB with optimum compression.
 CJK Bitmap Font Compression — Font Fusion implements a compression algorithm for CJK bitmap fonts, which ideally compresses the embedded bitmaps and provides a compressed CJK bitmap font support. This font format is Bitstream proprietary compression format for CJK bitmap fonts.
 Fractional Size and Positioning — Supports fractional sizing and positioning of characters, such that text strings can be fit into any region.
 Smart Scaling — Smart scaling regulates the adjustment of characters that extend beyond the set height parameters and may get clipped when rendered on small screen devices. The technology ensures that the scaled characters are in proportion to the other characters in the font.
 Cache Management — Includes a dedicated cache manager to manage the system performance. Uses the cache to store rendered characters (bitmaps).
 Small footprint — The Font Fusion code size for devices varies from 65 – 187 KB, depending on the configuration chosen.
 Extraordinary Typographical Quality — Native TrueType hinting produces high-quality output on any device. Additionally, the anti-aliasing techniques, TV/LCD modes improve the glyph output irrespective of the device (a mobile handset or a large digital TV).
 Low Memory Requirement — Only 16 – 40 KB of RAM required for a Latin font and 27 – 34 KB of RAM required for a stroke based Asian font.
 Scalable Text — Supports high quality scalable text that can be used by mobile and smart phones. The device manufacturers and mobile developers can replace the bitmaps at a single point size with scalable font that can be rendered at different font sizes.
 Stroke-based Fonts Fupport — Uses a proprietary stroke-based font technology that uses a library of common components, called "radicals", that appear in characters repeatedly. The radicals and strokes are then pieced together and rendered on the fly to create characters.

Language Coverage/Font Support
 Compact Asian fonts
 Industry Standard Asian Fonts
 Cyrillic
 Greek
 Arabic (complex scripting language)
 Hebrew (complex scripting language)
 Indian (complex scripting languages)
 Thai (complex scripting language)
 Over 50 other worldwide languages

Font Formats Supported
 Multiple master fonts
 WOFF fonts
 Type 1
 TrueType
 TrueType collections
 OpenType
 Compact font format (CFF)/Type 2
 TrueDoc Portable Font Resources (PFRs)
 Bitstream Speedo
 T2K
 Font Fusion Stroke (FFS)
 Embedded bitmaps (TrueType, TrueDoc, and T2K)
 Bitmap Distribution Format (BDF)
 Mac font suitcase (Dfont)
 Windows bitmap font format FNT/FON
 PCLeo (PCL Encapsulated Outline), an Intellifont font format
 PCLetto (PCL Encapsulated Truetype Outline), soft fonts for printing applications

Applications/Operating Systems Supported
 Cross-platform applications
 Web (HTML) applications
 Macintosh & Windows
 BREW
 Linux & UNIX
 Embedded operating systems
 Real time operating systems

Devices Supported
Consumer Electronic Devices, Mobile Handset, Set-top box, Digital TV, Printer, Printer Controller, Fax Machine, Multi-function Device, Medical Imaging Device, GPS System, Automobile Display, and other Embedded System

Software Applications Supported
Web application, Graphics application, Gaming application

Font Fusion Plug-In for Symbian
Font Fusion plug-in is available for the Symbian OS as a dynamic-link library (DLL). The plug-in inherits all the features supported by the core Font Fusion engine.

Font Fusion Plug-In for BREW
Font Fusion plug-in for BREW platform provides a standard font-rendering framework that implements different BREW interfaces, supporting scalable and multilingual text.

Font Fusion Plug-In for Qtopia
Font Fusion framework is available for Qtopia allowing any third party font rendering engine to work as plug-in with the Qt/Qtopia application platform. The framework also adds the capability to have any font format compatibility with Qt/Qtopia.

See also
 Bitstream Inc.

References

External links
 Bitstream Releases Panorama 5.0 and Font Fusion 5.0
 2007 Bitstream Press Releases
 Font Engine and Font Rasterizer Technology
 Embedded Technology Journal
 Font Fusion
 Bitstream Offers Small, Fast Font Rendering Subsystem for Symbian OS Mobile Phones

Typography